Trout Lake School is a public school that serves 200 students in grades K–12 located in Trout Lake, Washington. Unlike most school districts, where there is a clear distinction between the middle school/junior high and high school levels, they are combined at Trout Lake School. 83% of the students are White, while 13% are Hispanic and the rest are American Indian.

References

External links
Trout Lake School District

Public high schools in Washington (state)
High schools in Klickitat County, Washington